The Wangapeka River is a river of the Tasman Region of New Zealand's South Island. It rises in two branches, the North Branch and the South Branch, in the Matiri Range within Kahurangi National Park, meeting some 25 kilometres southeast of Karamea. It flows generally northeast to reach the Motueka River 30 kilometres south of Motueka.

The Wangapeka valley was the site of a major goldfield during the late 1860s, and is mentioned in some versions of the New Zealand folk song "Bright Fine Gold".

See also
List of rivers of New Zealand
Wangapeka Track

References

Rivers of the Tasman District
Kahurangi National Park
Rivers of New Zealand